The 2018 NA LCS season was the first year under partnership and sixth overall of the North American League of Legends Championship Series (NA LCS), a professional esports league for the MOBA PC game League of Legends. It was divided into spring and summer splits, each consisting of a regular season and playoff stage. The top six teams from the regular season advanced to the playoff stage, with the top two teams receiving a bye to the semifinals.

The three teams that qualified for the World Championship in 2018 were Team Liquid, 100 Thieves, and Cloud9.

Format 
Starting in 2018, the North American LCS announced that it would continue under partnership using a franchised model, rather than promotion and regulation. This changed the overall structure of the league, and encouraged long-term investments from owners, which allowed the league to implement revenue sharing, leading to a better foundation for both the teams and professional players. Professional players were also given a larger voice and more protection within the league.

The buy-in price for the league was $10 million for existing League of Legends teams, who had previously participated in the League Championship Series or Challenger Series. New teams would be subject to an additional $3 million ($13 million total), which was to be distributed to the teams that were replaced in the league as compensation. Interested parties were given applications in June, due on July 28, 2017. Over 100 existing esports organizations, traditional sports teams, venture capitalists and entrepreneurs reportedly applied. Those applications were then narrowed down to a shortlist, nicknamed "phase two", which saw participants travel to Riot Games' Los Angeles office to interview and review their applications. Riot Games and the North American League Championship Series players' association also decided that league would not expand and instead remain at 10 teams.

Buyers for the league were decided in mid-October. Six existing teams from the league, Cloud9, Counter Logic Gaming, Echo Fox, FlyQuest, Team Liquid and Team SoloMid, were accepted back into the league. The other four existing teams, Immortals, Phoenix1, Team Dignitas and Team EnvyUs, were declined entry into the restructured league. Due to their departure, four new organizations were added to the NA LCS, one endemic esports team, and three NBA affiliates. Longtime esports organization OpTic Gaming was reportedly awarded a spot in the league after receiving investment from Texas Rangers co-owner Neil Leibman. The other three new spots went to the Golden Guardians, supported by the Golden State Warriors co-owner Joe Lacob and his son Kirk, 100 Thieves backed by the Cleveland Cavaliers, and Clutch Gaming with support from the Houston Rockets.

Teams and rosters

Spring

Results

Regular season standings

Prize pool and championship points

Awards

Playoffs

Tiebreakers

First place

Third through sixth place

Playoff bracket

Summer

Regular season standings

Prize pool and championship points

Awards

Playoffs

Tiebreakers

Playoff bracket

Regional finals

References 

League of Legends Championship Series seasons
2018 multiplayer online battle arena tournaments
North American League of Legends Championship
North American League of Legends Championship
Spring 2018 in League of Legends competitions